The Type I U-boat was the first post–World War I attempt to produce an oceangoing submarine  for Nazi Germany's Kriegsmarine. Only two Type IAs were built, but the decision to halt production on further boats is believed to be because of political decisions and not because of major faults in the Type I design. Although the boats did not have any major design faults, they were known to be difficult to handle due to their poor stability and slow dive rate. The type was based on the design of the Finnish Vetehinen class and the Spanish Type E-1, designed by Ingenieurskantoor voor Scheepsbouw (the company also designed the Soviet S class submarine). The design later served as a basis for the development of other types of boats, primarily the VII and IX classes.

Constructed by Deschimag in Bremen, the first Type IA was launched on 14 February 1936. In 1940, the boats were called into combat duty due to the shortage of available submarines. Both boats experienced short, but successful combat careers. U-25 participated in five war cruises, sinking eight enemy ships. On 3 August 1940, while on a mine laying mission near Norway, U-25 struck a mine and sank with all hands on board.

U-26 carried out eight war cruises, sinking three merchant ships on its first mission laying mines. On its second war cruise it became the first U-boat during World War II to enter the Mediterranean Sea. U-26 participated in three other successful war patrols, sinking four additional merchant ships. On its eighth war cruise the boat sank three merchant ships and damaged another ship the next day. The attack on this ship led to severe depth-charging by two British warships, including . Unable to dive, U-26 was forced to surface where she was bombed by a Sunderland flying boat. The crew scuttled the submarine and were rescued by Allied warships.

List of Type I submarines

References

Bibliography

External links

 
Submarine classes
World War II submarines of Germany